Speewah is a locality in the Shire of Mareeba, Queensland, Australia.

Geography 
The Kennedy Highway is the north-west boundary of the locality.

The south-eastern part of the locality are in Dinden National Park and Speewah Conservation Park.

Education 
There are no schools in Speewah. Kuranda District State College in neighbouring Kuranda offers both primary and secondary schooling.

References 

Shire of Mareeba
Localities in Queensland